RGS Prep, formerly Lanesborough School, is an independent, preparatory school in Guildford, Surrey, England. The school was established in 1930 and acted as the choir school for Guildford Cathedral. Formerly an important feeder school for RGS Guildford, the two schools merged in 2021 with Lanesborough becoming RGS Prep.

History
RGS Prep, formerly Lanesborough School, was founded in 1930 by Mr A. E. J. Inglis and Mr W. H. B. Walker. Both were former assistant masters at Dulwich College. An initial advertisement stated ‘Boys will be prepared for Public School and the Royal Navy.’ There were only 19 pupils, but by the end of the year this had risen to 55. By 1935 there were 90 boys including a dozen or so boarders. The school continued to function during the war, and in 1949, Mr Stuart Swayne who had been serving in the armed forces returned to become joint headmaster.

When Mr Inglis retired in 1953, Mr Swayne took over with Mr. Walker. Mr. Walker retired in April 1955. Expansion continued in 1952 when the pre-prep department took occupancy of Braganza, a house in Aldersey Road. In 1964 another property in Aldersey Road called Kitano, became the Head's house. Its grounds were donated as extra school playing fields. The grounds became their present size when they were further extended by the acquisition of gardens of Markham House in 1970.

Lanesborough's connection with the Cathedral dates back to 1957. Before it had even been consecrated, a forward looking provost, Walter Boulton decided to plan ahead and recruit some boy choristers from Lanesborough. In 1983 Lanesborough joined the Choir School's Association.

The next watershed in the school's history took place during 1978 when Lanesborough became ‘the feeder school’ of the Royal Grammar School. This was at a time when the Royal Grammar School was becoming independent of state control, and were worried that their usual intake from state primary schools would dry up once it became fee-paying. Academic standards were pushed higher with this liaison. However, unlike the majority of schools which has a junior and senior section, no guarantees are given for transfer. The school shared the same board of governors but was given a great deal of self-determination. Rising pupil numbers necessitated more space and further modernisation.

In 1992 a new purpose-built classroom block and gym were opened by Bernard Weatherill, the Speaker of the House of Commons, whose sons had attended the school.

The latest acquisition, Markham House, was opened in 2000; it provided yet more purpose built rooms and a new Astroturf alongside a dedicated Sports Hall, which opened in 2016.

The age of the boys attending Lanesborough would change from 3–13 to 3-11 when the last year 8 group left in summer 2020.

In 2021 it was announced that Lanesborough was to merge with the Royal Grammar School, with Lanesborough becoming RGS Prep.

Choir
Lanesborough has educated Guildford Cathedral's choirboys for much of its existence. Compared to many cathedral choirs in England, Guildford's has a relatively short history and unlike them, Lanesborough does not provide boarding. All choirboys are pupils at the school and receive educational bursaries.

In May 1960, Barry Rose, the school's choir master, was appointed as the first Organist and Master of the Choristers of the new Guildford Cathedral, and a number of Lanesborough choir boys became part of the first Cathedral Choir.

Old Boys
The most famous 'Old Boy' is Flight Lieutenant John Vere Hopgood DFC (1921–1943), a World War II Lancaster pilot who died in the first wave of the Dambusters' raid into Germany. Guy Gibson, the commanding officer, stated that in his opinion, 'Hoppy' Hopgood, his second in command, was the best pilot in the squadron. The mother of John Hopgood DFC recently came to visit the pupils at Lanesborough.

George Nash, a bronze medalist rower at the 2012 London Olympic Games, was also from Lanesborough. Nash won a gold medal at Rio 2016 for rowing, and re-visited the school to open the all new sports hall.

Dr Brian Curwain (Lanesborough 1953–60), a research scientist and pharmacist was Chair of the Royal Pharmaceutical Society's English Board from 2009 to 2010. In the 1970s he carried out research at St Mary's Hospital Medical School which contributed to the development of modern ulcer healing drugs.

References

External links
 Official website
 Profile on the ISC

Boys' schools in Surrey
Choir schools in England
Educational institutions established in 1930
Defunct schools in Surrey
1930 establishments in England
Defunct Church of England schools
Schools in Guildford
Educational institutions disestablished in 2021
2021 disestablishments in England